Complex Networks is an American media and entertainment company for youth culture, based in New York City.  It was founded as a bi-monthly magazine, Complex, by fashion designer Marc (Ecko) Milecofsky. Complex Networks reports on popular and emerging trends in style, sneakers, food, music, sports and pop culture. Complex Networks reached over 90 million unique users per month in 2013 across its owned and operated and partner sites, socials and YouTube channels. The print magazine ceased publication with the December 2016/January 2017 issue. Complex currently has 6.02 million subscribers and 1.8 billion total views on YouTube. As of 2019, the company's yearly revenue was estimated to be US$200 million, 15% of which came from commerce.

Complex Networks has been named by Business Insider as one of the Most Valuable Startups in New York, and Most Valuable Private Companies in the World. Complex Networks CEO Rich Antoniello was named among the Silicon Alley 100. In 2012, the company launched Complex TV, an online broadcasting platform.

In 2016, it became a joint-venture subsidiary of Verizon and Hearst. The company changed hands again in the fourth quarter of 2021, becoming a subsidiary of BuzzFeed in a $300 million transaction.

History
Complex was established in 2002 by the founder of the Eckō Unltd. brand, Marc Ecko, as a print magazine aimed at providing young men a report of the latest in hip hop, fashion and pop culture without regard to race. The name Complex evolved from a slogan developed to promote the Eckō Unltd. website: "Ecko.complex". The idea was to create a men's magazine that combined Eckō's streetwear and hip hop attitude along with the style of Japanese men's magazines by providing consumer guides. This was achieved by creating a magazine in two sections: one traditional magazine, and the other a shopping guide.

In 2005, Complex was joined by senior publishing executive turned future CEO, Rich Antoniello and the former senior editor of Vibe magazine, Noah Callahan-Bever, who became editor-in-chief and chief content officer a year later. By 2006, Complex had begun to turn a profit which allowed the magazine to consider an expansion of their online presence. In April 2007, Complex soft-launched a media network with four websites: NahRight, Nice Kicks, SlamxHype and MoeJackson.

Complex
In September 2007, Complex launched Complex Media in order to fully capitalize on the trend toward digital content. In 2010, ad sales grew 154%. According to comScore, Complex got 12 million unique hits in March 2012. This encouraged large brands such as Coors, AT&T, Ford, McDonald's, Nike, Adidas and Apple to advertise within the collective. Complex now includes over 100 sites.

In 2011, Complex acquired Pigeons & Planes, an indie music and rap blog, and brought their total sites to 51 with monthly traffic of 25 million uniques. In 2012, Complex launched Four Pins, a humorous menswear site, edited by Fuck Yeah Menswear author Lawrence Schlossman; Sneaker Report, a performance footwear site; and First We Feast, a food culture site edited by former Time Out New York food editor Chris Schonberger. In 2013, Complex launched the dance music site Do Androids Dance and Green Label, a branded content site presented by Mountain Dew. That year, Complex also acquired the sneakerhead culture magazine and website Sole Collector.

On November 4, 2013, Complex premiered a new logo and cover design on Instagram that would appear online, as well as on the December 2013 Eminem cover issue.

In 2013, Complex partnered with Mountain Dew to launch "Green Label" an entertainment and culture website. In 2014, Complex launched an NBA-themed website called "Triangle Offense" in a partnership with Bacardi rum.

In August 2014, Complex ranked #3 in the United States in a ComScore survey of unique visitors between the ages of 18 and 34 with 20.3 million in that demographic per month. In January 2015, it announced its acquisition of Collider, the online source for movies, television, breaking news, incisive content, and imminent trends. Collider.com reaches over 3 million monthly unique readers (comScore, December 2014) powered by a team of ten writers, including founder and Editor in Chief Steve Weintraub. In February 2018, Complex sold Collider.com to former head-of-video Marc Fernandez.

In 2015, Do Androids Dance was merged into Complex. In 2016, Four Pins was closed.

Funding
In 2009, Complex raised $12.8 million from Accel Partners and Austin Ventures. In September 2013, it secured $25 million in a second round of funding from Iconix Brand Group, who own Rocawear, Starter, Eckō Unltd. and Umbro, among others.

Verizon Hearst Media Partners subsidiary
On April 18, 2016, Complex was acquired by a joint venture of Hearst Communications and Verizon Communications, Verizon Hearst Media Partners. The venture emphasized a goal of building "a portfolio of the emerging digital brands of the future for the millennial and Gen-Z audience", and proposed that Complex would develop content for Verizon-owned AOL and go90.

After a failure to reach expectations, on June 29, 2018, Verizon announced that go90 would shut down.

Covers
Complex became known early on for its double-sided covers and split format. Complex covers often combined celebrities from across music, film and sports. For example, Mos Def and David Bowie appeared together on the cover of the August/September 2003 issue. Some of Complex early covers included Nas (May 2002), Tony Hawk and Xzibit (June/July 2002), Ludacris and Dale Earnhardt Jr. (April/May 2003), and Mos Def and David Bowie (August/September 2003). In 2007, Complex gave Kim Kardashian her first-ever magazine shoot and cover.

Complex has since expanded to interactive digital covers. In September 2019, the American rapper Kid Cudi and the Japanese designer Nigo were interviewed by Complex and also appeared jointly on a digital cover and told the stories of their careers and rise in the entertainment and streetwear industries.

Complex shows
Complex TV launched in 2012 as an online broadcaster of original content. Nathan Brown, a long-time video development and production executive, serves as general manager of Complex TV and Video. In December 2013, a subsidiary of Complex TV, Complex News, was launched, focusing on day-to-day news. In 2014, Pluto.tv added Complex Media as a content partner. Complex Content Studio is supported by an 18-person editorial team. 
According to WNIP source, "by 2016, Complex Networks had shifted 80% of its content budget to video and was launching dozens of individual shows under Complex's YouTube channel and a number of spin-off properties".
On November 10, 2017, a block of Complex TV series began airing on the U.S. cable network Fuse under the Complex x Fuse banner.

Complex Networks has produced more than two dozen original shows, which include Hot Ones and Desus vs. Mero.

Podcasts
Complex Networks launched three original podcasts at the end of 2019 in collaboration with a Swedish podcast firm Acast. Watch Less, covering such topics as movies and pop culture, hosted by Khris 'Khal' Davenport and Frazier Tharpe. The Complex Sports Podcast (formerly Load Management), hosted by Zach 'Chopz' Frydenlund, Zion Olojede, and Adam Caparell discusses sports and sports culture. The Complex Sneakers Podcast covers the history and present day of sneaker culture and is hosted by Joe La Puma, Matthew Welty, and Brendan Dunne.

ComplexCon
In Spring 2016, Complex Networks announced a new project, "ComplexCon", an annual festival in the form of thematics exhibitions, music concerts, discussion panels, streetwear culture and content related to pop culture and mass audience entertainment. The first two-day event took place at the Long Beach Convention and Entertainment Center in November 2016 and featured performances by Snoop Dogg, Skrillex, Kid Cudi and more. In 2019 the festival was held twice. The first event took place at McCormick Place in collaboration with a focus on local artists, designers and musicians. The second festival occurred in the traditional Long Beach, CA and included appearances by Selena Gomez, LL Cool J, Lil Kim, Offset, Kid Cudi, Lil Yachty, Timothée Chalamet, Yara Shahidi and Tyga.

ComplexLand
In lieu of ComplexCon during the COVID-19 pandemic, Complex Networks launched a five-day virtual festival named "ComplexLand" in December 2020. The game took place in a video game format where users could visit virtual shops and order products that would be shipped to them in real life. Players could also access video content such as panels and performances. The event included virtual appearances by T-Pain, Fat Joe, Lil Yachty, Jack Harlow, and Donatella Versace. The interactive experience was accessible through web browser and was developed by Jam3 in WebGl.

The Complex Shop
In December 2019, Complex Networks launched an online store called the Complex Shop. At launch, the store included items from 70 different clothing brands, including some exclusive collaborations.

The store also carries merchandise from Complex's various brands and content.

The Complex Shop has partnered with the Google News Initiative to measure audience engagement and consumer behavior. They also partnered with Neighborhood Spot and UNION x Dodgers to sell branded products.

Brand partnerships
In 2013, Digiday stated Complex was one of the publishers that "acts like an agency" based on their branded content and brand partnerships. In 2013 alone, Complex created an average of 47 pieces of content a month on behalf of major brands, including McDonald's, Gillette, Levi's, Toyota, Adidas and others. It also partnered with PepsiCo to launch GreenLabel.com, a Mountain Dew-branded lifestyle site that's staffed by Complex's editorial employees. Green Label currently attracts over twice as much traffic as MountainDew.com. Later in 2013, Complex worked with Dr. Pepper to a series of videos aimed at young males featuring producer/songwriter The-Dream.

Awards

Controversies

Kim Kardashian photo
In 2009, AnimalNewYork.com reported that Complex had posted a digitally unenhanced version of April/May issue cover star Kim Kardashian. Complex swapped the enhanced image on their site, but not before the unenhanced version had gone viral. Kardashian responded to the incident on her blog, saying: "So what: I have a little cellulite. What curvy girl doesn't!?" She went on to say that she was "proud" of her body, posting behind-the-scenes pictures of the shoot on her website. The incident was covered by a variety of online publications including Huffington Post, NY Daily News, Business Insider, Gawker, and others.

Wale threatens Complex staff
On December 11, 2013, Complex writer Insanul Ahmed received a call from rapper Wale complaining that his latest album, The Gifted, had not been included on Complex "50 Best Albums of 2013" list. A portion of the conversation was recorded and posted on the Complex website and on Complex TV on December 13. Wale could be heard threatening: "Get the security ready." According to Complex, Wale refused requests to meet, but he did post a humorous Instagram video that day which made light of the situation. Wale, later appearing on Hot97, said that his fall-out with Kid Cudi had something to do with the snub, and that he was not "begging Williamsburg hipsters" to like his music. Wale was referring to the October/November 2010 issue of Complex in which Kid Cudi said: "We don't fuck with you musically." The quote quickly went viral.

See also
 Ego Trip
Stüssy
The Hundreds
Vice Media
Supreme
Virgil Abloh

References

External links

2002 establishments in New York City
2016 disestablishments in New York (state)
Bimonthly magazines published in the United States
Defunct magazines published in the United States
Fashion magazines published in the United States
Hip hop fashion
Hip hop magazines
Magazines established in 2002
Magazines disestablished in 2016
Magazines published in New York City
Men's magazines published in the United States
Monthly magazines published in the United States
Online magazines with defunct print editions
Online music magazines published in the United States
Online mass media companies of the United States
Street culture
Youth culture
Joint ventures